John Doran may refer to:

John Doran (baseball) (1867–after 1895), American baseball player
John Doran (British Army officer) (1824–1903)
John Doran (ice hockey) (1910–1975), Canadian ice hockey player
John Doran (tennis) (born 1978), Irish tennis player
John Doran (writer) (1807–1878), English editor and writer
John Desmond Beauchamp Doran (1912–1946), British army intelligence officer
John James Doran (1864–1904), American Medal of Honor recipient
Johnny Doran (1907–1950), Irish uilleann piper
Johnny Doran (actor) (born 1962), American child actor
Jack Doran (born John Francis Doran; 1896–1940), Irish footballer